Velappaya  is a village in Thrissur district in the state of Kerala, India. It is famous for the Mahadeva temple, also known as Velappaya Shiva temple.

Kerala University of Health sciences (Medical University) is located mostly in velappaya area.(though the area is said to be allocated in 3 Panchayath areas).. velappaya is in Avanoor Panchayath area..

Velappaya is 2 kilometres from the Thrissur - shornur road. (To the left through velappaya road overbridge)...

You can also reach velappaya through mundur (5 km from the left of Guruvayoor-Thrissur road)

Other information
Velappaya is a village in Thrissur district, very near to the Kerala University of Health and Allied sciences( Medical university).
Its a beautiful place and have been famous for the Lord Mahadeva Temple. Velappaya is in Avanoor Panchayath, the Panchayath office being situated in Velappaya.School, hospital, supermarket, medical shop, auditorium and hostels are available. Transportation services to town are very frequent. Nearby train station s Mulangunnathukavu. 
Location:- 12 km from the Thrissur town, 5 km from mundur, 1.5 km from medical university

References

Villages in Thrissur district